George E. Tebeau (December 26, 1861 – February 4, 1923) was an American professional baseball player who played as an outfielder in Major League Baseball. Tebeau batted and threw right-handed.

Career
In a six-season career, Tebeau was a .269 lifetime hitter with 15 home runs and 311 runs batted in in 628 games played. Nicknamed "White Wings" for his speed, he also totaled 228 stolen bases, 623 hits, 96 doubles, 54 triples, and 441 runs scored.

The older brother of infielder Patsy Tebeau, who was his teammate while in Cleveland, George played over 50 games at all three outfield positions and first base. One of his most productive seasons came in 1889 with Cincinnati, when he hit .252 and posted career-highs in stolen bases (61), RBI (70), runs (110), hits (110) and walks (69). He later became the owner of the Kansas City Blues franchise of the American Association.

In addition, Tebeau is recognized as the joint-first Major League Baseball player ever to hit a home run in the first at-bat of his career. He shares this "first ever" distinction with Mike Griffin; both Tebeau and Griffin hit their debut at-bat home runs on the same day, and as it is unclear which player hit his home run at a chronologically earlier time of the day, both have historically been considered the "first."

Tebeau died in Denver at the age of 61.

See also
List of Major League Baseball players with a home run in their first major league at bat
List of Major League Baseball career stolen bases leaders

External links

Retrosheet

19th-century baseball players
Cincinnati Red Stockings (AA) players
Cleveland Spiders players
Toledo Maumees players
Portland Webfeet players
Washington Senators (1891–1899) players
Major League Baseball outfielders
Baseball players from St. Louis
Denver (minor league baseball) players
Denver Mountain Lions players
Fort Wayne Farmers players
Columbus Senators players
Columbus Buckeyes (minor league) players
Grand Rapids Furnituremakers players
Denver Grizzlies (baseball) players
Kansas City Blues (baseball) players
Louisville Colonels (minor league) managers
1861 births
1923 deaths
Kansas City Blues (baseball) managers